is a Japanese footballer currently playing as a midfielder for Roasso Kumamoto.

Career statistics

Club
.

Notes

References

1998 births
Living people
Juntendo University alumni
Japanese footballers
Association football midfielders
J2 League players
J3 League players
Roasso Kumamoto players